The Doctor in Spite of Himself (Italian: Medico per forza) is a 1931 Italian comedy film directed by Carlo Campogalliani. It is a free adaptation of Molière's play Le Médecin malgré lui. It was made at the Cines Studios in Rome.

After starring the comedy, for many times in the theaters, Ettore Petrolini reinvents Sganarelle, in a way close to the character Bertoldo of Giulio Cesare Croce. Referring to Petrolini, the film critic Filippo Sacchi had written "You have to accept it as it is, with his temperament and his admirable qualities ... with the grotesque and the joke that elude even without logic in the comic genre"

Cast
Ettore Petrolini as Sganarello
Tilde Mercandalli as Lucinda
Letizia Quaranta as Martina
Augusto Contardi as Geronte
Sergio Rovida as Leandro
 Elma Krimer as the nurse
Dria Paola 
Enzo De Felice
Checco Durante

References

Bibliography
 Moliterno, Gino. The A to Z of Italian Cinema. Scarecrow Press, 2009.

External links 
 

1931 films
1931 comedy films
Italian comedy films
Italian black-and-white films
1930s Italian-language films
Films directed by Carlo Campogalliani
Films based on works by Molière
Cines Studios films
Italian films based on plays
1930s Italian films